The 2021 Osijek local elections were elections for the 49th Mayor of Osijek, the two deputy mayors and the 31 members of the Osijek City Council. It is a part of the Croatian local elections, which are taking place on 16 and 30 May 2021. 
The incumbent mayor, Ivan Vrkić, announced on 11 July 2020 that he will not run for another term.

This was the third direct election for the mayor of Osijek (simultaneously held with elections for all other county prefects and mayors in Croatia) since the popular vote method was introduced in 2009, as previously those officials had been elected by their county or city assemblies and councils.

Mayoral election

Council election

See also 

 2021 Croatian local elections
 2021 Zagreb local elections
 2021 Split local elections
 2021 Rijeka local elections
 List of mayors in Croatia
 List of mayors of Osijek

References 

Osijek 2021
Osijek
Osijek local
History of Osijek